Gesner is a surname. Notable people with the surname include:

Abraham Pineo Gesner (1797–1864), Canadian physician and geologist
Alonzo Gesner (1842–1912), American politician and surveyor in Oregon
Conrad Gesner (1516–1565), Swiss naturalist, and botanical reference for Gesner
Johann Matthias Gesner (1691–1761), German classical scholar

See also
Gessner

German-language surnames